A love rose is a glass tube with a paper or plastic rose inside of it, and a bit of cork or foil on the ends to keep the rose from falling out. While ostensibly intended as romantic gifts, their primary known use is as a pipe to smoke drugs such as crack cocaine or methamphetamine.  They are commonly sold at convenience stores in the United States, particularly in inner-city locations.

Another variant known as a pizzo, commonly used as a pipe for the consumption of methamphetamine, has a round bulbous shape opposite the open end of the glass tube.

See also
Drug paraphernalia
Pizzo (pipe)

References

Drug paraphernalia
Cocaine
Methamphetamine